Lucy Moore may be:

Lucy Moore (botanist) (1906–1987), New Zealand botanist
Lucy Moore (historian) (born 1970), British historian